Winston Lake is a lake in Thunder Bay District, Ontario, Canada. The primary outflow is Winston Creek, part of the Pays Plat river system, which flows downstream through an unnamed lake to Banana Lake.

References

Lakes of Thunder Bay District